Isak Khel is a town and union council of Lakki Marwat District in Khyber Pakhtunkhwa province of Pakistan. It is located at 32°40'3N 70°51'47E and has an altitude of 250 metres (823 feet).

References

Union councils of Lakki Marwat District
Populated places in Lakki Marwat District